Dragić Joksimović (Bačina, July 18, 1893 – Sremska Mitrovica, August 1, 1951) was a Serbian politician and attorney.

Joksimović was born in Bačina, Kingdom of Serbia on July 18, 1893. He became politically active as a student in the Independent Radical Party and later within the Democratic Party. He was later elected into the National Assembly.

In August 1945 he became a member of the Temporary National Assembly of Yugoslavia. He led the Democratic Representatives Club within the assembly. The Democratic Party representatives eventually abandoned the assembly in September of that year.

Joksimović defended Draža Mihailović during the Belgrade Process. He was later imprisoned himself in 1949, dying in the Sremska Mitrovica prison in 1951.

References

External links
Gorski car srpske advokature

1893 births
1951 deaths
Serbian politicians
20th-century Serbian lawyers
Democratic Party (Yugoslavia) politicians
Representatives in the Yugoslav National Assembly (1921–1941)
Yugoslav lawyers